Pordic (Gallo: Pordic) is a commune in the Côtes-d'Armor department of Brittany in northwestern France. On 1 January 2016 the former commune of Tréméloir merged into Pordic.

Population

People from Pordic are called pordicais in French.

Breton language
The municipality launched a linguistic plan through Ya d'ar brezhoneg on September 19, 2008.

International relations
Pordic is twinned with:
  Hayle in the UK county of Cornwall.

See also
Communes of the Côtes-d'Armor department

References

External links

Official website 

Communes of Côtes-d'Armor

Communes nouvelles of Côtes-d'Armor